Kevin Love (born June 8, 1979) is an American former stock car racing driver. He ran five races in the 2004 Craftsman Truck Series season, all for Fiddleback Racing. He also shares the same name as famous basket ball player Kevin Love.

Racing career
Born in Des Moines, Iowa, Love raced late models in North Carolina. Love was a two-time champion in the Coca-Cola Cup Late Model Stock Car Championship, a member of the NASCAR Weekly Racing Series.

Love first raced in the Hooters Pro Cup Series in 2002, driving the No. 60 Chevrolet, finishing 12th in his debut at Jennerstown Speedway. He made two more starts in 2002, finishing seventh and 30th at Lonesome Pine Speedway and Concord Speedway, respectively, the latter ending with a DNF due to a mechanical failure. Love returned to the series in 2003 at Concord, but finished 28th due to another mechanical failure.

In 2004, Love made his NASCAR Truck Series debut in the No. 67 Fiddleback Ford in the Kroger 250 at Martinsville Speedway, starting 30th and finishing 27th at the short track, two laps down. Love failed to qualify for the UAW/GM Ohio 250 at Mansfield Motorsports Park after qualifying was rained out, and the No. 67 had no owners' points, and Todd Bodine took over the No. 67 for the Infineon 200 at Lowe's Motor Speedway, though Love returned for his next start at Dover. He finished 24th after crashing on the frontstretch on lap 152. He ran with Fiddleback again at Memphis, finishing 21st. After a 24th at the Milwaukee Mile, Love finished a career-best 11th at Kansas Speedway. However, this would be his final start in the No. 67.

In 2006, Love competed in the Pro All-Stars Series, finishing 13th in the championship.

Motorsports career results

NASCAR
(key) (Bold - Pole position awarded by qualifying time. Italics - Pole position earned by points standings or practice time. * – Most laps led.)

Craftsman Truck Series

References

External links
 

Living people
1979 births
NASCAR drivers
Sportspeople from Des Moines, Iowa
Racing drivers from Des Moines, Iowa
Racing drivers from Iowa
CARS Tour drivers